is a 2003 Japanese film about a group of juvenile delinquents set in the year 2025. The juveniles are host to a "murder gene", and are sent to an uninhabited island by the government so that they can be rehabilitated. The government studies the causes of the gene, and implants an experiment on the juveniles called a "Tag". The Tag gives the juveniles murder impulses and memory loss, and both boys and girls start to brutally kill each other.

This movie is being distributed by AsiaVision, the Asian live-action label from Urban Vision Entertainment.

External links 
AsiaVision Official Website

2003 films
2000s Japanese-language films
2000s Japanese films